Keaney is a surname. Notable people with the surname include:

Brian Keaney, British author born in Walthamstow, East London
Conal Keaney, Irish footballer and hurler
Frank Keaney (1886–1967), college men's basketball coach
Helen Keaney, host on the Home Shopping Network
Luke Keaney (born 1982), Irish Gaelic footballer
Paul Keaney, MBE, ISO, formerly headmaster at Clontarf Orphanage

See also
Keaney Gymnasium, multi-purpose arena in Kingston, Rhode Island, USA